Prince Robin of Sayn-Wittgenstein-Berleburg (Robin Alexander Wolfgang Udo Eugen Wilhelm Gottfried; born 29 January 1938) is the son of Gustav Albrecht, 5th Prince of Sayn-Wittgenstein-Berleburg and his wife, Franco-Swedish noblewoman Margareta Fouché d'Otrante.

A banker, he married, firstly, in New York 29 January 1970 (and divorced in 1979) Swedish noblewoman Birgitta af Klercker, born in Stockholm in 1942, with whom he had issue; 
 Prince Sebastian of Sayn-Wittgenstein-Berleburg, born in New York 30 January 1971, married 2002 to Julie Toussaint, by whom he had issue:
Prince Ferdinand, born 2004
Princess Stella, born 2006
Prince Philipp，born 2011
Princess Natascha of Sayn-Wittgenstein-Berleburg, born in New York 24 November 1973, married 2008 to Don Eugenio Litta-Modignani, Marchese di Menzaggo e Vinago had issue:
Donna Tatiana Litta Modignani, born 2008 
He married, secondly, 29 November 1979 Marie-Christine Heftler-Louiche, born in Paris 1938, and had issue.
Princess Marie of Sayn-Wittgenstein-Berleburg, born in Paris 11 July 1980, married 2005 to Olivier Le Maire.

Robin is a younger brother of Richard, 6th Prince of Sayn-Wittgenstein-Berleburg, husband of Princess Benedikte of Denmark. Because she did not discontinue her responsibilities as a princess in her native land after marriage and spends a substantial portion of her time there, she retained the prospect of transmitting Danish succession rights to her own children under specific conditions. No final ruling on the dynastic status in Denmark of his brother's unmarried son, Prince Gustav having been issued, Robin and, after him, his son Sebastian and grandson Ferdinand follow Gustav in the line of succession to inherit the Berleburg legacy in the event Gustav were to renounce it to take up permanent residence in Denmark, or if he were to die without any direct male heirs.

Ancestry

References

The Sayn-Wittgenstein Family 

Robin of Sayn-Wittgenstein-Berleburg
People from Giessen
1938 births
Living people